Cacia subcephalotes is a species of beetle in the family Cerambycidae. It was described by Stephan von Breuning in 1968. It is known from Laos.

References

Cacia (beetle)
Beetles described in 1968